Lake Atitlán is a lake in the Guatemalan Highlands of the Sierra Madre mountain range. The lake is located in the Sololá Department of southwestern Guatemala. It is known as the deepest lake in Central America.

Name
Atitlán means "between the waters". In the Nahuatl language, "atl" is the word for water, and "titlan" means between. The "tl" at the end of the word "atl" is dropped (because it is a grammatical suffix) and the words are combined to form "Atitlán".

Geography
Atitlán is technically an endorheic lake, feeding from two nearby rivers and not draining into the ocean. It is shaped by deep surrounding escarpments and three volcanoes on its southern flank. The lake basin is volcanic in origin, filling an enormous caldera formed by a supervolcanic eruption 84,000 years ago. The culture of the towns and villages surrounding Lake Atitlán is influenced by the Maya people. It should not be confused with the smaller Lake Amatitlán.

Lake Atitlán is renowned as one of the most beautiful lakes in the world, and is one of Guatemala's most important national and international tourist attractions. German explorer and naturalist Alexander von Humboldt called it "the most beautiful lake in the world," and Aldous Huxley famously wrote of it in his 1934 travel book Beyond the Mexique Bay: "Lake Como, it seems to me, touches on the limit of permissibly picturesque, but Atitlán is Como with additional embellishments of several immense volcanoes. It really is too much of a good thing."

The area around San Marcos has particularly tall cliffs abutting the lake and in recent years has become renowned for cliff diving.

Agriculture
The area supports extensive coffee and avocado orchards and a variety of farm crops, most notably corn and onions. Significant agricultural crops include: corn, onions, beans, squash, tomatoes, cucumbers, garlic, chile verde, strawberries and pitahaya fruit. The lake itself is a significant food source for the largely indigenous population.

Geological history

The first volcanic activity in the region occurred about 11 million years ago, and since then the region has seen four separate episodes of volcanic growth and caldera collapse, the most recent of which began about 1.8 million years ago and culminated in the formation of the present caldera.

The enormous eruption dispersed ash over an area of some : it has been detected from Florida to Ecuador, and can be used as a stratigraphic marker in both the Pacific and Atlantic oceans (known as Y-8 ash in marine deposits). A chocoyo is a type of bird which is often found nesting in the relatively soft ash layer.

Since the end of Los Chocoyos, continuing volcanic activity has built three volcanoes in the caldera. Volcán Atitlán lies on the southern rim of the caldera, while Volcán San Pedro and Volcán Tolimán lie within the caldera. San Pedro is the oldest of the three and seems to have stopped erupting about 40,000 years ago. Tolimán began growing after San Pedro stopped erupting and probably remains active, although it has not erupted in historic times. Atitlán has developed almost entirely in the last 10,000 years and remains active, its most recent eruption having occurred in 1853.

On February 4, 1976, a very large earthquake (magnitude 7.5) struck Guatemala, killing more than 26,000 people. The earthquake fractured the lake bed and caused subsurface drainage from the lake, allowing the water level to drop  within one month.

Ecological history
In 1955, the area around Lake Atitlán became a national park. The lake was mostly unknown to the rest of the world, and Guatemala was seeking ways to increase tourism and boost the local economy. It was suggested by Pan American World Airways that stocking the lake with a fish prized by anglers would be a way to do just that. As a result, an exotic non-native species, the black bass, was introduced into the lake in 1958. The bass quickly took to its new home and caused a radical change in the species composition of the lake. The predatory bass caused the elimination of more than two-thirds of the native fish species in the lake and contributed to the extinction of the Atitlan grebe, a rare bird that lived only in the vicinity of Lake Atitlán.

A unique aspect of the climate is what is referred to as Xocomil (of the Kaqchickel language meaning "the wind that carried away sin"). This wind is common late morning and afternoon across the lake; it is said to be the encounter of warm winds from Pacific meeting colder winds from the North.

In August 2015 a thick bloom of algae known as Microcystis cyanobacteria re-appeared in Lake Atitlan; the first major occurrence was in 2009. Bureaucratic red tape has been blamed for the lack of action to save the lake. If current activities continue unchecked, the toxification of the lake will make it unsuitable for human use.

Culture

The lake is surrounded by many villages in which Maya culture is still prevalent and traditional dress is worn. The Maya people of Atitlán are predominantly Tz'utujil and Kaqchikel. During the Spanish conquest of the Americas, the Kaqchikel initially allied themselves with the invaders to defeat their historic enemies, the Tz'utujil and K'iche' Maya, but were themselves conquered and subdued when they refused to pay tribute to the Spanish.

Santiago Atitlán is the largest of the lakeside communities, and it is noted for its worship of Maximón, an idol formed by the fusion of traditional Mayan deities, Catholic saints, and conquistador legends. The institutionalized effigy of Maximón is under the control of a local religious brotherhood and resides in various houses of its membership during the course of a year, being most ceremonially moved in a grand procession during Semana Santa. Several towns in Guatemala have similar cults, most notably the cult of San Simón in Zunil.

 
While Maya culture is predominant in most lakeside communities, Panajachel has been overwhelmed over the years by Guatemalan and foreign tourists. It attracted many hippies in the 1960s, and although the civil war caused many foreigners to leave, the end of hostilities in 1996 saw visitor numbers boom again, and the town's economy is almost entirely reliant on tourism today.

Several Mayan archeological sites have been found at the lake. Sambaj, located approximately 55 feet below the current lake level, appears to be from at least the pre-classic period. There are remains of multiple groups of buildings, including one particular group of large buildings that are believed to have been the city center.

A second site, Chiutinamit, where the remains of a city were found, was discovered by local fishermen who "noticed what appeared to be a city underwater". During subsequent investigations, pottery shards were recovered from the site by divers, which enabled the dating of the site to the late pre-classic period (300 B.C. – 300 A.D.), more specifically 250 AD.

A project titled "Underwater archeology in the Lake Atitlán. Sambaj 2003 Guatemala" was recently approved by the Government of Guatemala in cooperation with Fundación Albenga and the Lake Museum in Atitlán. Because of the concerns of a private organization as is the Lake Museum in Atitlán the need to start the exploration of the inland waters in Guatemala was analyzed.

There is no road that circles the lake. Communities are reached by boat or roads from the mountains that may have brief extensions along the shore. Jaibalito can only be reached by boat. Santa Catarina Palopó and San Antonio Palopó are linked by road to Panajachel. Main places otherwise are Santa Clara La Laguna, San Juan La Laguna, and San Pedro La Laguna in the west; Santiago Atitlán in the south; Cerro de Oro in the southeast; and San Lucas Tolimán in the east.

The site was revered for its striking connection to the Popol Wuj of the K'iche' Mayan peoples.

Guatemalan civil war

"During the Guatemalan Civil War (1960 - 1996), the lake was the scene of many terrible human rights abuses, as the government pursued a scorched earth policy." Indigenous people were assumed to be universally supportive of the guerrillas who were fighting against the government, and were targeted for brutal reprisals. At least 300 Maya from Santiago Atitlán are believed to have disappeared during the conflict.

Two events of this era made international news. One was the assassination of Stanley Rother, a missionary from Oklahoma, in the church at Santiago Atitlán in 1981. In 1990, a spontaneous protest march to the army base on the edge of town was met by gunfire, resulting in the death of 11 unarmed civilians. International pressure forced the Guatemalan government to close the base and declare Santiago Atitlán a "military-free zone". The memorial commemorating the massacre was damaged in the 2005 mudslide.

Hurricane
Torrential rains from Hurricane Stan caused extensive damage throughout Guatemala in early October 2005, particularly around Lake Atitlán. A massive landslide buried the lakeside village of Panabaj, causing the death of as many as 1,400 residents, leaving 5,000 homeless, and many bodies buried under tonnes of earth. Following this event, Diego Esquina Mendoza, the mayor of Santiago Atitlán, declared the community a mass gravesite: "Those buried by the mudslide may never be rescued. Here they will stay buried, under five meters of mud. Panabáj is now a cemetery."

Four and a half years after Hurricane Stan, Tropical Storm Agatha dropped even more rainfall causing extensive damages to the region resulting in dozens of deaths between San Lucas Tolimán and San Antonio Palopó.
Since then roads have been reopened and travel to the region has returned to normal.

Gallery

See also
 List of places in Guatemala

Notes

Further reading
 Morgan Szybist, Richard (2004), The Lake Atitlan Reference Guide: The Definitive Eco-Cultural Guidebook on Lake Atitlan, Adventures in Education, Inc.
 Newhall, Christopher G., Dzurisin, Daniel (1988); Historical unrest at large calderas of the world, USGS Bulletin 1855, p. 1108
 Vallance J.W., Calvert A.T. (2003), Volcanism during the past 84 ka at Atitlan caldera, Guatemala, American Geophysical Union, Fall Meeting 2003
 Kingery, Dennis (2003), Improving on Nature?, National Center for Case Study Teaching in Science

External links

 AMSCLAE Authority Lake Atitlan
 Volcano World Information

Volcanic crater lakes
Lakes of Guatemala
Pleistocene calderas
Lake Atitlan
Lake Atitlan
VEI-7 volcanoes
Lake Atitlan
Volcanoes of Guatemala
Central American pine–oak forests